The extinct Solenoporaceae have traditionally been interpreted as a group of red algae ancestral to the Corallinales.

The genus from which they take their name, Solenopora, originates in the Ordovician. Unlike the Corallinaceae, this family has large vegetative cells and an undifferentiated thallus.
Additionally there are external, non-calcified sporangia.

The differences in structure suggest that the holotype is not an alga at all, but rather is a chaetetid sponge.  Post-Palaeozoic specimens therefore require re-classification.  However, some algal taxa are still classified within the genus.

Some specimens of algal Solenopora retain an original pink colouration, which is banded with growth stages of the fossil; this is produced by boron-containing hydrocarbons.

The solenoporaceae mineralized with calcite.

Other genera within the Solenoporaceae 
Although the following other genera have been included in this family, their status is uncertain due to the loose definition of the family.
Dendronella  Moussavian and Senowbari-Daryan 1988
Elianella
Marinella  Pfender 1939
Metasolenopora  Pia 1930
Parachaetetes  Deninger 1906
Pycnoporidium  Yabe and Toyama 1928
Solenoporella  Rothpletz
Tauristorea  Senowbari-Daryan and Link 2005

See also

References

Red algae genera
Fossil algae
Cambrian first appearances
Cenozoic extinctions
Fossils of Georgia (U.S. state)
Paleozoic life of Ontario
Paleozoic life of Newfoundland and Labrador
Paleozoic life of Nunavut
Paleozoic life of Quebec